Zdeněk Humhal (30 December 1933 – 24 November 2015) was a Czech volleyball player who competed for Czechoslovakia in the 1964 Summer Olympics. He was born in Prague. In 1964, he was part of the Czechoslovak team which won the silver medal in the Olympic tournament. He played eight matches.

References

External links
Zdeněk Humhal's profile at Sports Reference.com
Zdeněk Humhal's obituary 

1933 births
2015 deaths
Czech men's volleyball players
Czechoslovak men's volleyball players
Olympic volleyball players of Czechoslovakia
Volleyball players at the 1964 Summer Olympics
Olympic silver medalists for Czechoslovakia
Olympic medalists in volleyball
Medalists at the 1964 Summer Olympics
Sportspeople from Prague